A vanity label (see related topic on vanity press) is an informal name sometimes given to a record label founded as a wholly  or partially owned subsidiary of another, larger, and better established (at least at the time of the vanity label's founding) record label, where the subsidiary is (at least nominally) controlled by a successful recording artist, designed to allow this artist to release music by other artists they admire. The parent label handles the production and distribution and funding of the vanity label, but the album is usually released with the vanity brand name prominent. Usually, the artist/head of the vanity label is signed to the parent label, and this artist's own recordings will be released under the vanity brand name. Creating a vanity label can be an attractive idea for the parent label, primarily as a "perk" to keep a successful artist on the label's roster happy and as a venue to bring fellow artists to the public's attention.

Prominent vanity labels

References

"Vanity labels: good business or an ego boost?" New York Times, 5/10/92
"Vanity Labels" "SoundShots", 29/12/2020